Uncial 0249 (in the Gregory-Aland numbering), is a Greek uncial manuscript of the New Testament. Paleographically it has been assigned to the 10th century.

Description 
The codex contains the text of the Gospel of Matthew 25:1-9, on 2 parchment leaves (21 cm by 15 cm), with some lacunae. Possibly it was written in two columns per page, 15 lines per page, in uncial letters. Survived leaves are in a fragmentary condition.

It is a palimpsest, the upper text contains the text of Psalms with a commentary.

Currently it is dated by the INTF to the 10th century.

Location 
Currently the codex is housed at the Bodleian Library (MS. Auct. T. 4.21, ff. 326, 327) in Oxford.

Text 
The Greek text of this codex is mixed with a strong element of the Byzantine text-type. Aland placed it in Category III.

See also 

 List of New Testament uncials
 Textual criticism

References 

Greek New Testament uncials
Palimpsests
10th-century biblical manuscripts
Bodleian Library collection